Vaccinium myrsinites is a species of flowering plant in the heath family known by the common name shiny blueberry. It is native to the southeastern United States from Alabama, Georgia, South Carolina and Florida. It may occur as far west as Louisiana.

Vaccinium myrsinites is an erect, branching shrub that reaches one meter (40 inches) in maximum height. It is rhizomatous and can form very large colonies. Colonies measuring one kilometer (0.63 miles ) across and over 1,000 years old have been observed. It is generally evergreen, but some forms are deciduous. The stems have angular green twigs. The leathery, green or grayish green, oval leaves are up to roughly one centimeter (0.4 inches) long and have smooth or vaguely toothed edges. The undersides are glandular. The flowers are urn-shaped or cylindrical, white to pink or red-tinged, and borne in clusters of up to 8. They may be nearly one centimeter long. The fruit is a black or waxy blue berry up to 8 or 9 millimeters in length containing several seeds.

Vaccinium myrsinites grows in several habitat types in the southeastern U.S., including prairies, pine barrens, bog margins, flatwoods, Florida scrub, palmetto communities, and rosemary balds. It also grows in disturbed, clearcut, and fallow cultivated areas. Associated plants include scrub palmetto, netted pawpaw, scrubclover, dodder, Florida blazingstar, scrub mint, tree sparkleberry, saw palmetto, Lyonia, dwarf huckleberry, inkberry, bracken fern, several oaks, many species of pine. The best sites are dry, sandy stretches of acidic soils in full sunlight.

In common with many southeastern scrub species, this plant is fire-adapted. It can recover from a fire by sprouting from its rhizome. This is also the way it forms vast colonies of cloned individuals. The plant also reproduces sexually by seed. The seeds are dispersed by animals, which relish the fruits.

Vaccinium myrsinites is likely a hybrid of two other blueberry species, small cluster blueberry and Darrow's evergreen blueberry. Individuals may resemble one or the other parent species; the "darrowoid" phase is more common in coastal Florida, while the "tenneloid" phase can be found in southern Georgia and northern Florida. This species also hybridizes with many other blueberries.

The Seminole used V. myrsinites for food and for a variety of ceremonial and medicinal  purposes, including the treatment of "hog sickness", or unconsciousness.

References

External links
United States Department of Agriculture Plants Profile
The Nature Conservancy
Vaccinium myrsinites - Floridata Plant Encyclopedia 
Atlas of Florida Vascular Plants

myrsinites
Flora of the Southeastern United States
Plants described in 1783
Blueberries
Taxa named by Jean-Baptiste Lamarck